The South Dakota Messenger was a weekly feminist newspaper in South Dakota, United States from January 1912 to October 1914. It was published in Pierre, South Dakota by Wm. J. Mundt. Marguerite Karcher-Sahr, the daughter of Pierre pioneer Henry Karcher, wrote for the newspaper. Ruth B. Hipple was one of the editors.

See also 

 Women's suffrage in South Dakota

Bibliography
Leslie Ann Medema, The Role of the South Dakota Messenger in the Woman Suffrage Campaign of 1913-1914 (University of South Dakota Press, 2000)

References

Defunct newspapers published in South Dakota
Newspapers established in 1913
Feminist newspapers
1913 establishments in South Dakota
South Dakota suffrage
Women's suffrage publications in the United States
History of women in South Dakota